The 1936 Clemson Tigers football team was an American football team that represented Clemson College in the Southern Conference during the 1936 college football season. In their sixth season under head coach Jess Neely, the Tigers compiled a 5–5 record (3–3 against conference opponents), finished sixth in the conference, and outscored opponents by a total of 98 to 95.

Net Berry was the team captain. The team's statistical leaders included tailback Joe Berry with 434 passing yards and fullback Mac Folger with 522 rushing yards and 48 points scored (8 touchdowns).

Five Clemson players were selected as first-team players on the 1937 All-South Carolina football team: backs Joe Berry and Mac Folger; tackle Manuel Black; guard Bill Bryant; and center Harold Lewis.

Schedule

References

Clemson
Clemson Tigers football seasons
Clemson Tigers football